The 1981–82 season of the European Cup football club tournament was won for the only time by Aston Villa in the final against Bayern Munich. The final is remembered mainly for the performance of young stand-in goalkeeper Nigel Spink who made a host of saves from the experienced Bayern players. Villa's winning goal came from Peter Withe who converted Tony Morley's cross in off the post. It was the sixth consecutive year that an English club won the competition.

Liverpool, the defending champions, were eliminated by CSKA Sofia in the quarter-finals.

Bracket

Preliminary round

|}

First leg

Second leg

BFC Dynamo won 3–1 on aggregate

First round

|}

First leg

Second leg

Austria Wien won 3–2 on aggregate.

Dynamo Kyiv won 2–1 on aggregate.

3–3 on aggregate; BFC Dynamo won on away goals.

Aston Villa won 7–0 on aggregate.

Anderlecht won 6–2 on aggregate.

Juventus won 2–1 on aggregate.

Baník Ostrava won 5–3 on aggregate.

Red Star Belgrade won 10–2 on aggregate.

AZ won 4–1 on aggregate.

Liverpool won 8–0 on aggregate.

CSKA Sofia won 1–0 on aggregate.

Glentoran won 5–1 on aggregate.

3–3 on aggregate; KB won on away goals.

Universitatea Craiova won 3–2 on aggregate.

Benfica won 5–0 on aggregate.

Bayern Munich won 6–0 on aggregate.

Second round

|}

First leg

Second leg

Dynamo Kyiv won 2–1 on aggregate.

2–2 on aggregate; Aston Villa won on away goals.

Red Star Belgrade won 4–3 on aggregate.

Anderlecht won 4–2 on aggregate.

Liverpool won 5–4 on aggregate.

CSKA Sofia won 3–2 on aggregate.

Universitatea Craiova won 4–2 on aggregate.

Bayern Munich won 4–1 on aggregate.

Quarter-finals

|}

First leg

Second leg

Aston Villa won 2–0 on aggregate.

Anderlecht won 4–2 on aggregate.

CSKA Sofia won 2–1 on aggregate.

Bayern Munich won 3–1 on aggregate.

Semi-finals

|}

First leg

Second leg

Bayern Munich won 7–4 on aggregate.

Aston Villa won 1–0 on aggregate.

Final

Top scorers
The top scorers from the 1981–82 European Cup (excluding preliminary round) are as follows:

Notes

References

External links
1981–82 All matches – season at UEFA website
 European Cup results at Rec.Sport.Soccer Statistics Foundation
 All scorers 1981–82 European Cup (excluding preliminary round) according to protocols UEFA
1981-82 European Cup - results and line-ups (archive)

1981–82 in European football
European Champion Clubs' Cup seasons